The Blowing Stone is a perforated sarsen at  in Kingston Lisle, which is in the traditional county of Berkshire, but is currently administered as part of Oxfordshire.

Blowingstone Hill is part of the escarpment of the Berkshire Downs, at the crest of which is The Ridgeway.

Notability

The stone is capable of producing a booming sound if someone with the required skill blows into one of the holes the right way. According to legend it could be heard atop White Horse Hill, where 19th-century antiquarians thought King Alfred the Great's Saxon troops had camped, and that this was how Alfred summoned them for the Battle of Ashdown against the Danes in AD 871.

Literature
Thomas Hughes' novel Tom Brown's School Days refers to it as the Blawing Stwun and calls the village Kingstone Lisle.

It is also one of the "sacred stones" mentioned in William Horwood's Duncton Wood, the first book in his fantasy fiction series about a group of moles.

References

External links

Anglo-Saxon archaeology
Archaeological sites in Oxfordshire
History of Berkshire
Stone Age sites in England
Stones
Tourist attractions in Oxfordshire
Vale of White Horse